Dendrocitta is a genus of long-tailed passerine birds in the crow and jay family, Corvidae. They are resident in tropical South and Southeast Asia. The generic name is derived from the Greek words dendron, meaning "tree," and kitta, meaning "magpie".

The species are plumaged in black, grey and rufous. Typically, the face and flight feathers are black, and the back is rufous. They are highly arboreal and rarely come to the ground to feed.

They are, in taxonomic order:

References 

 Madge and Burn, Crows and Jays

External links
Treepie videos on the Internet Bird Collection

 
Bird genera